Jangal Mein Mangal is a 1972 Bollywood romance film directed by Rajendra Bhatia. The film stars Kiran Kumar, Reena Roy and Pran in pivotal roles.

Cast
Kiran Kumar as Rajesh 
Reena Roy as Leela 
Balraj Sahni as Thomas
Pran as Retired Colonel M. K. Das / Raghu (Double Role) 
Chandrashekhar as CBI Officer Shekhar / Boatman
Sonia Sahni as Professor Laxmi
Narendranath as Baldev 
Jayshree T. as Saroj
Meena T. as Lata 
Meena Roy as Sophia
Gulshan Bawra as Lalu
Jagdish Raj as Senior Police Inspector 
Paintal as Totaram 
V. Gopal as Constable Bahadur Singh 
Chaman Puri as Village Head 
Bharat Kapoor as Police Inspector
Krishan Dhawan as Ratanlal
Upendra Trivedi as Main Villain

Soundtrack

External links

References

1972 films
1970s Hindi-language films
1970s romance films
Films scored by Shankar–Jaikishan
Indian romance films
Hindi-language romance films